Buried Secrets may refer to:
 Buried Secrets (Body of Proof), the eighth episode of medical drama Body of Proof
 Buried Secrets (EP), the second EP by Painkiller
 Buried Secrets (film), a 1996 television film
 Sarah Jane Smith: Buried Secrets, an audio play
 Stolen Voices, Buried Secrets, a true-crime documentary
 The Bible's Buried Secrets, the title of a NOVA program
Buried Secrets, Episode 55 of Teenage Mutant Ninja Turtles.